Satopanth South West also called P. 6770 is a mountain of the Garhwal Himalaya in Uttarakhand, India. It is 40th highest located entirely within the Uttrakhand. Nanda Devi, is the highest mountain in this category. It lies in the same connecting ridge that joins Satopanth and Bhagirathi Parbat I. It lies 1.8 km SW of Satopanth. Its nearest higher neighbor Satopanth . It is located 3.4 km SE of Vasuki South  and 5.2 km NNW lies Bhagirathi I .

Gangotri National Park

The entire surrounding area are protected within the  Gangotri National Park, one of the largest conservation area in India. The Gangotri National Park is home to several world-class treks, including Gangotri Gomukh Tapoban Nandanvan, Kedarnath Vasuki tal trek, Har ki dun valley trek,  Badrinath to Satopanth tal trek, Gangotri to Kedar tal trek, Gangotri to Badrinath trek via Kalindi khal and many more.

Neighboring and subsidiary peaks

neighboring or subsidiary peaks of Satopanth south west:

 Satopanth, 7,075m (23,212 ft), 
 Vasuki Parbat, 6,792m (22,283 ft), 
 Bhagirathi Parbat III, 6,454m (21175 ft)
 Swachhand, 6,721m (22051 ft)
 Chaukhamba I, 7,138m (23419 ft)
 Mandani Parbat, 6,193m (21175 ft)

Glaciers and rivers

On the southern side lies Swachhand Bamak and on the northern side lies Sundar Bamak. Sundar bamak merge with Chaturangi Bamak that later joins Gangotri Glacier Swachhand bamak also merge with Gangotri Glacier. From the snout of Gangotri Glacier comes out Bhagirathi River one of the main tributaries of river Ganga. Bhagirathi joins the Alaknanda River the other main tributaries of river Ganga at Dev Prayag and called Ganga there after.

See also

 List of Himalayan peaks of Uttarakhand

References

Mountains of Uttarakhand
Six-thousanders of the Himalayas
Geography of Chamoli district